The curve-winged sabrewing (Pampa curvipennis) is a species of hummingbird in the "emeralds", tribe Trochilini of subfamily Trochilinae. It is endemic to Mexico.

Taxonomy and systematics

The curve-winged sabrewing's taxonomic history is complex. It was formerly placed in genus Campylopterus. A molecular phylogenetic study published in 2014 found that the genus Campylopterus was polyphyletic. In the revised classification to create monophyletic genera, the curve-winged sabrewing was moved to the resurrected genus Pampa by some taxonomic systems. BirdLife International's Handbook of the Birds of the World (HBW) retained the species in Campylopterus.

The relation of the curve-winged sabrewing to other species and the number and identities of its subspecies also differ among taxonomic systems. HBW is the most conservative: It treats the curve-winged sabrewing as one of three subspecies of grey-breasted sabrewing (Campylopterus curvipennis curvipennis). The second is C. c. excellens, which some other systems treat as a subspecies of curve-winged. The third is C. c. pampa, which some other systems treat as the full species wedge-tailed sabrewing (Pampa pampa). The Clements taxonomy calls P. curvipennis the wedge-tailed sabrewing with subspecies P. c. curvipennis ("curve-winged") and P. c. pampa ("wedge-tailed"). These two systems were last updated in 2021. In mid-2022 the North American Classification Committee of the American Ornithological Society and the International Ornithological Committee (IOC) adopted the name curve-winged sabrewing for P. curvipennis and merged the former long-tailed sabrewing (P. excellens) into it as a subspecies. They treat P. pampa as the separate species wedge-tailed sabrewing. The two-subspecies model for P. curvipennis was actually a return to the mid-twentieth century treatment of some authors.

This article follows the two-subspecies IOC taxonomic model.

Description

The curve-winged sabrewing is a large hummingbird with a long, wedge-shaped tail. Adult males have a dull metallic violet blue to greenish blue crown, metallic green to bronze green upperparts, and bluish green uppertail coverts. Their tail feathers are mostly dull metallic bluish green that becomes purplish black at the ends. The outermost pair have dusky to brownish gray outer webs. Much of their face is dull grayish white to gray, with a white spot behind the eye. Their underparts are dull grayish white. Adult females are very similar to the male. However, their crown is dull blue rather than violet- to greenish blue. Their two outermost pairs of tail feathers have wide dull gray or whitish tips, and much of the outer web of the outermost pair is brownish gray. Immature birds are similar to the adult female, with a duller crown whose feathers have buff tips, a pale cinnamon wash to the underparts, and a buff wash on the outer tail feathers.

Both sexes have a slightly decurved black bill. Males have a bright metallic violet crown and the rest of their upperparts are deep metallic green. Much of their face is brownish gray with a white spot behind the eye. Their underparts are grayish white darkening to dull grayish undertail coverts. Their tail is dull metallic green with blackish violet tips to the feathers. The female's crown is duller and its tail feathers have white, not dark violet, tips.

Distribution and habitat

The nominate subspecies of curve-winged sabrewing is found in southeastern Mexico from San Luis Potosí south to Veracruz and Oaxaca. Subspecies P. excellens is found only in a small area of southeastern Mexico around the Sierra de los Tuxtlas in the states of Veracruz, Tabasco, and Chiapas. (Note that the map includes the range of P. pampa in the Yucatán Peninsula). The species inhabits the interior and edges of semi-arid to humid evergreen forest. It ranges from sea level to about  but is more common at the lower elevations.

Behavior

Movement

The curve-winged sabrewing is thought to be sedentary but it may make some seasonal elevational movements.

Feeding

Very little is known about the curve-winged sabrewing's foraging technique or diet. Both are assumed to be similar to those of the wedge-tailed sabrewing though it too has not been studied extensively. That species consumes nectar, as do all hummingbirds, and insects like most of them. It forages in the low to middle strata of the forest.

Breeding

As is the case for feeding, most of the curve-winged sabrewing's breeding phenology has not been detailed separately from that of the wedge-tailed. The nominate is believed to nest between March and July and excellens might breed from September to May.

Vocalization

Some of the descriptions of curve-winged sabrewing vocalizations are embedded in wedge-tailed sabrewing accounts. Some are steady, persistent chipping and a shrill, nasal peek. The species usually sings from dense vegetation, and its songs are complex and variable, usually including insect-like chips, squeaks, and squeals, followed by a series of excited warbled or gurgling notes. Males sing year-round, sometimes in small groups. Some tail or wing movements are associated with perched singing displays.

Status

The IUCN follows HBW taxonomy and so does not assess the curve-winged sabrewing separately from the three-subspecies Campylopterus curvipennis wedge-tailed. That wider-ranging species is considered to be of Least Concern, though its population size is not known and is believed to be decreasing.

References

curve-winged sabrewing
Endemic birds of Eastern Mexico
Birds of Mexico
curve-winged sabrewing
curve-winged sabrewing
Birds of the Sierra Madre Oriental
Taxobox binomials not recognized by IUCN